The Boston mayoral election of 1925 occurred on Tuesday, November 3, 1925. Malcolm Nichols, a former member of the Massachusetts House of Representatives and Massachusetts Senate, defeated nine other candidates to be elected mayor.

Many votes were split between three Democratic candidates (Glynn, O'Neil, Coakley), which was a factor in the election of Nichols, a Republican. While municipal elections in Boston have been nonpartisan since 1910; as of 2018, Nichols is the most recent Republican to be elected Mayor of Boston.

In 1918, the Massachusetts state legislature had passed legislation making the Mayor of Boston ineligible to serve consecutive terms. Thus, incumbent James Michael Curley was unable to run for re-election.

Nichols was inaugurated on Monday, January 4, 1926.

Candidates
 Charles L. Burrill, member of the Massachusetts Executive Council since 1923, and former Treasurer and Receiver-General of Massachusetts (1915–1920)
 Daniel H. Coakley, disbarred attorney
 Alonzo B. Cook, Massachusetts State Auditor since 1915
 W. T. A. Fitzgerald, Register of Deeds, and former member of the Massachusetts Senate (1901–1903)
 Theodore A. Glynn, Commissioner of the Boston Fire Department
 John A. Keliher, Sheriff of Suffolk County since 1917, and former member of the U.S. House of Representatives (1903–11) and Massachusetts Senate (1899–1900)
 Walter G. McGauley, dentist
 Malcolm Nichols, former member of the Massachusetts House (1907–09) and Massachusetts Senate (1914, 1917–19)
 Thomas C. O'Brien, District Attorney of Suffolk County since 1922
 Joseph H. O'Neil, former member of the U.S. House of Representatives (1889–1895) and Massachusetts House (1878–1882, 1884)

Results

See also
List of mayors of Boston, Massachusetts

References

Further reading
 

Boston mayoral
Boston
1925
Non-partisan elections
1920s in Boston